Gambia joined the 2021 Africa Cup of Nations as the lowest-ranked team of the tournament as well as the lowest-ranked team ever to participate in AFCON. They debuted with a 1–0 win over Mauritania followed by a 1–1 draw to Mali. Gambia qualified for the round of 16 with a game to spare and on 20 January defeated Tunisia 1–0 in their final group match. They finished with the same points as Mali, which, however, won the group due to a better overall goal difference.

Gambia continued to impress in the round of 16, defeating Guinea 1–0 to advance to the quarter-finals of the tournament. After a goalless first half, Gambia lost 2–0 to host Cameroon in the quarter-final in Douala.

Records

2021 Africa Cup of Nations

Group stage

Round of 16

Quarter-finals

Squads

Notes

References

Countries at the Africa Cup of Nations
Football in the Gambia